The Williams F112 is a small turbofan engine made by Williams International designed to power cruise missiles. It has been used as the powerplant for the AGM-129 Advanced Cruise Missile and the AGM-86B advanced cruise missile, as well as the experimental X-36 and X-50.

Design and development

Although Williams originally designed these small turbofans to power target drones while aiming for a contract in the Subsonic Cruise Armed Decoy (SCAD) program, it quickly became apparent that these were valuable tools to be used in the future to power advanced cruise missiles. Originally designated the F107-WR-14A6, then designated the F107-WR-103 by Williams then designated the F112-WR-100 by the USAF.

Though the true benefits that the F112 brought to the AGM-129 are classified, it has been said that the F112 increased the range of the AGM-129 to four times that of the AGM-86B.  Another benefit is that the infrared heat signature has also been reduced or nearly eliminated, aiding the stealthiness of the AGM-129. This was accomplished with the use of high tech materials and coatings.

Applications
 AGM-129 ACM
 Boeing X-50
 McDonnell Douglas X-36

Specifications

See also

References

External links

 National Museum of the USAF F112 fact sheet
 Archived "Aviation Gas Turbine Forecast" sample, 2009 by Forecast International
 F112 on LeteckeMotory.cz (cs)

Low-bypass turbofan engines
1970s turbofan engines
F112
Centrifugal-flow turbojet engines